The Gaià is a 59 km long river in Tarragona Province, Catalonia.

Course
Its source is at Santa Coloma de Queralt, situated in the Catalan Central Depression, gathering the waters of the Serra de Brufaganya and Serra de Queralt mountain ranges. It flows through deep gorges across the Catalan Pre-Coastal Range and then close to Santes Creus and, at the end, into the Mediterranean at the Tamarit Castle, Tarragonès, near Altafulla forming a coastal lagoon separated from the sea by a sandbar. The river mouth is a protected area.

Tributaries 
Its main tributaries are:
Torrent de Claret
Riu de baix
Torrent del Biure
Torrent Sant Magí
Torrent de Vallespinosa
Torrent de Rupit
Torrent Rubio
Torrent de Pinatelles
Riu de Boix
Torrent d'en Serrat
Torrent de Biany
L'Escurri

See also 
 List of rivers of Catalonia

References

External links 
 Gaià River – On the route of the castles in Camp de Tarragona region – part I., in Catalonia, Spain (in English)
 

Rivers of Spain
Rivers of Catalonia